Martin Králik (born 3 April 1995) is a Slovak footballer who plays as a centre-back for SK Dynamo České Budějovice in Czech First League.

Career

MŠK Žilina
He made his professional debut for Žilina against Nitra on 2 November 2013. The game concluded with a 0-2 result in favour of Šošoni. Králik had played for the entire match and contributed with a winning goal, following a pass from Róbert Pich.

Králik was released from MŠK Žilina, as the club had entered liquidation, due to a coronavirus pandemic.

International career
Králik was called up for two unofficial friendly fixtures held in Abu Dhabi, UAE, in January 2017, against Uganda and Sweden. He capped his debut against Uganda, being fielded for the entire game. Slovakia went on to lose the game 1–3. Králik, however was not fielded in a 0–6 defeat against Sweden later that week.

Honours

MŠK Žilina
Fortuna Liga: Winners: 2016-17

References

External links
Futbalnet profile 
Eurofotbal profile 

1995 births
Living people
Slovak footballers
Slovak expatriate footballers
People from Prievidza
Sportspeople from the Trenčín Region
Association football defenders
FC Baník Prievidza players
MŠK Žilina players
SK Dynamo České Budějovice players
Slovak Super Liga players
Czech First League players
Slovak expatriate sportspeople in the Czech Republic
Expatriate footballers in the Czech Republic
Slovakia youth international footballers
Slovakia under-21 international footballers
Slovakia international footballers